The Spoornet Class 14E1 of 1994 was a South African electric locomotive.

In December 1994 Spoornet took delivery of the last of ten locally manufactured Class 14E1 dual voltage electric mainline locomotives with a Bo-Bo wheel arrangement. They had been preceded in 1991 by three prototype Class 14E locomotives.

Manufacturer
The dual voltage 3 kV DC and 25 kV AC Class 14E1 electric locomotive was designed by Consortium 14E consisting of Siemens, ABB, AEG-Westinghouse, General Electric Company and Alsthom-Atlantique, headed by Siemens. They were built for Spoornet by Union Carriage & Wagon (UCW) in Nigel, Transvaal, under licence to Swiss Locomotive and Machine Works (SLM) in Winterthur.

The original order had been placed for fifty locomotives. When one of the units developed a vibration in the gear box, the order for fifty locomotives was summarily reduced to ten only given the unsatisfactory trial results to date.

Characteristics
These dual cab locomotives had a roof access ladder on one side only, just to the right of the cab access door. The roof access ladder end was designated the no. 1 end. The cabs were connected by a corridor along the centre of the locomotive.

With the exception of the Class 9E, all previous South African electric locomotives ran on spoked wheels and used spur gears. The Swiss-built Class 14E ran on solid wheels and used double helical or herringbone gears with a traction motor to wheel gear ratio of 20:103, while the locally built Class 14E1 was delivered with the traditional spoked wheels but with helical gears and a traction motor to wheel gear ratio of 18:67.

Unlike the later dual voltage Classes 19E, 20E and 21E which were equipped to automatically transition between AC and DC mode on the run, the Class 14E1 had to be stopped and then restarted under the different voltage. Along with the earlier Class 14E, these electric locomotives were some of the most powerful at the time. They were equipped with three-phase AC motors (induction motors) made by Siemens and also incorporated Siemens' sophisticated train communication network system.

Service
By 2006, Class 14E1 locomotives were all shedded at Bellville Loco in Cape Town. In freight service they were employed on the route between Cape Town and Beaufort West in the Western Cape. Since they are dual voltage 3 kV DC and 25 kV AC locomotives, they can work on any electrified line country-wide with the exception of the 50 kV AC Sishen-Saldanha iron ore line.

In 1998 a number of Spoornet's electric locomotives and most of their Class 38-000 electro-diesel locomotives were sold to Maquarie-GETX (General Electric Financing) and leased back to Spoornet for a ten-year period which was to expire in 2008.

Beginning c. 2005, selected Class 14E1 locomotives were employed to haul the Blue Train all the way along the Cape Town-Pretoria route across the 25 kV AC stretch between Beaufort West and Kimberley. By 2012 they often ran country-wide when hauling the Blue Train. Being fast and giving a comfortable ride in an air conditioned cab, the Class 14E1 became popular with drivers.

From July 2012, possibly as a result of popular demand, eight of the Class 14E1 locomotives were repainted in a special blue Transnet Freight Rail (TFR) livery to match the Blue Train livery. After two incidents shortly thereafter, in 2013 with Class 14E1 no.  and in 2014 with Class 14E no.  when the locomotives caught fire and were destroyed while working the Blue Train, the Class was replaced by a pair of blue-liveried Class 18E locomotives on Blue Train service.

Serial numbers
UCW did not allocate works numbers to the locomotives they built for Spoornet. On the Class 14E1, the transformer serial numbers are engraved in the top right corner of a large plate which depicts the circuit diagram of the transformer, mounted below the sill and halfway between the bogies on the roof access ladder side of the locomotive. These serial numbers do not follow the locomotive unit number sequence. Their transformer numbers, last livery and disposal are listed in the table.

Illustration

References

External links

Bo-Bo locomotives
Cape gauge railway locomotives
3150
Multi-system locomotives
Railway locomotives introduced in 1994
SLM locomotives
Union Carriage & Wagon locomotives
1994 in South Africa